VA254 may refer to:
 Ariane flight VA254, an Ariane 5 launch that occurred on 30 July 2021
 Virgin Australia flight 254, with IATA flight number VA254
 Virginia State Route 254 (SR 254 or VA-254), a primary state highway in the United States